Rachmat Latief (born 27 September 1988) is an Indonesian professional footballer who plays as a centre-back for Liga 2 club Persipa Pati.

Club career

Martapura
In 2018, Latief signed a contract with Indonesian Liga 2 club Martapura.

Arema
He was signed for Arema to play in Liga 1 in the 2019 season. Rachmat made his debut on 13 September 2019 in a match against Borneo at the Kanjuruhan Stadium, Malang.

PSCS Cilacap
In 2021, Rachmat Latief signed a contract with Indonesian Liga 2 club PSCS Cilacap. He made his league debut on 26 September in a 1–0 win against PSIM Yogyakarta at the Manahan Stadium, Surakarta.

Persipa Pati
Latief was signed for Persipa Pati to play in Liga 2 in the 2022–23 season. He made his league debut on 30 August 2022 in a match against Nusantara United at the Moch. Soebroto Stadium, Magelang.

Career statistics

International

Honours

Club 
Arema
 Indonesia President's Cup: 2019

References

External links
 
 Rachmat Latief at Liga Indonesia

1988 births
Living people
Bugis people
Sportspeople from Makassar
Association football defenders
Indonesian footballers
Indonesia international footballers
Indonesian Premier Division players
Liga 1 (Indonesia) players
PSM Makassar players
Persiram Raja Ampat players
Sriwijaya F.C. players
Persiba Balikpapan players
Arema F.C. players
Borneo F.C. players
20th-century Indonesian people
21st-century Indonesian people